The Angola national under-17 football team is the national under-17 football team of Angola and is controlled by the Federação Angolana de Futebol. The team competes in the Africa U-17 Cup of Nations and the FIFA U-17 World Cup, which is held every two years.

Honours 
 Africa U-17 Cup of Nations:
 Winners (0):

Tournament Records

FIFA U-16 and U-17 World Cup record

CAF U-16 and U-17 World Cup Qualifiers record

Africa U-17 Cup of Nations record

Current squad

References

See also 
 Angola national under-20 football team
 Angola national football team
 Federação Angolana de Futebol

African national under-17 association football teams
under-17